Sybrand Botes (born 16 September 1976) is a South African boxer. He competed in the men's light heavyweight event at the 1996 Summer Olympics.

References

1976 births
Living people
Light-heavyweight boxers
South African male boxers
Olympic boxers of South Africa
Boxers at the 1996 Summer Olympics
People from Vanderbijlpark
Sportspeople from Gauteng